Antony Thekkek, also known as Thampy Antony, is an Indian-American film actor, writer, activist and producer. As a writer he has published books in Malayalam and English. He is the author of the books Koonampara County, Life of Ouso, Lady Biker and Vasco da Gama. As an actor, he is active primarily in Malayalam cinema. He is also the elder brother of Malayalam actor Babu Antony. He is the first Malayalam actor to own a Tesla car. The actor has won the Basheer Amma Malayalam Award for his book Vasco da Gama.

Early life 

Thampy Antony was born in Ponkunnam into a Kerala Christian family. He is an architect by profession. He immigrated to the United States and has lived in the San Francisco Bay Area for over 3 decades.

Film career 

Antony made his film debut, with ‘Arabia’, a film that starred his younger brother Babu Antony in the lead. He has since then acted in many American and Indian productions, predominantly in Malayalam language. He won the Best Actor Award at the Honolulu International Film Festival in 2005 for portraying the role of Dr. Acharya in the English film 'Beyond the Soul', directed by Rajeev Anchal. In 2010, he featured in the Hollywood film Cash (2010 film).

Thampi Antony produces films under the banner of 'Kayal Films'  and has produced critically acclaimed movies like “Kalkata new “ Made in USA “
Parudeesa, Sufi Paranja Katha' Papilio Buddha“ Janaki”Monsoon mangoes “ and  “Naam” 
(film)]]''.

Filmography
 Headmaster ( 2022) as Ramakrishnen Menon.
 Puzhayamna (2021)As Avinash 
 Elam(2020)as Old man in the bar 
 Changapuzha park(short)as   Narayanankutty 
 Naam(2018) as Priest Pavanakuzhi 
 10 Kalpanakal (2016)
 EMSum penkuttyum (In post production)
 Monayi engene anayi
 ABCD: American-Born Confused Desi(2013)
  Papilio Buddha (2013) as Gandhian Ram Das
 Kalimannu (2013) as Doctor
 Celluloid(2013)
  Parudeesa (2012) as Fr. Mannooran and Decon Jose 
  Ivan Megharoopan (2012) as Publisher Swamy 
 Dam999(2011) as The Architect 
  Abu, Son of Adam (2011) as Ustad
  A Million Dollars (short) (2011) as Thampy 
 Yathra Thudarunnu(2011)
  The Wedding (short) (2010) as Michael 
 Ca$h (2010) as Bahadurjit Tejeenderpeet Singh 
  Sufi Paranja Katha (2010) as Shanku Menon 
  In Ghost House Inn (2010) as Dr. George Christopher 
  Yugapurushan (2010) as Bhadran 
 Janaki(2009)
  Bhramaram(2009)
  Calcutta News (2008) as Doctor
  Palunku (2006) as Prof. Sukumaran Nair
 Made in United States (2005) 
  Nothing But Life (2004) as Col. Abdullah
  Beyond the Soul (2002) as Dr. Acharya
 Jananayakan(1999) as Prabhakara Kaimal
 Arabia (1995) as Zapher Ali

References 

   6.https://abc7news.com/gateway-nursing-home-hayward-ca-coronavirus-antony-thekkek/6109546/

Sources
6 https://english.manoramaonline.com/entertainment/entertainment-news/2020/03/07/eelam-malayalam-movie-wins-award-golden-state-film-festival.html
7 https://www.americanbazaaronline.com/2020/03/19/malayalam-film-eelam-wins-award-at-golden-state-film-festival-440537/
https://www.eastbaytimes.com/2020/04/19/coronavirus-nursing-homes-with-covid19-deaths-have-history-of-serious-problems/

External links 
 Profile in Rotten Tomatoes
 
 Thampi Antony at MSI

Male actors from Kerala
Living people
Male actors in Malayalam cinema
Indian male film actors
Film producers from Kerala
Malayalam film producers
People from Kottayam district
21st-century Indian male actors
Year of birth missing (living people)